Waterford Township is one of twenty-six townships in Fulton County, Illinois, USA.  As of the 2010 census, its population was 187 and it contained 92 housing units.

Geography

Unincorporated towns
 Sepo at 
(This list is based on USGS data and may include former settlements.)

Extinct towns
 Waterford at 
(These towns are listed as "historical" by the USGS.)

Cemeteries
The township contains the main Waterford Cemetery.
Also family cemeteries:Ames Cemetery and the Ashby cemetery

Major highways
  U.S. Route 24
  Illinois Route 78
  Illinois Route 100

Airports and landing strips
 G Bray Airport
 Norris Farms Airport

Landmarks
 Dickson Mounds State Park

Demographics

School districts
 Lewistown School District 97

Political districts
 Illinois's 17th congressional district
 State House District 94
 State Senate District 47

References
 
 United States Census Bureau 2007 TIGER/Line Shapefiles
 United States National Atlas

External links
 City-Data.com
 Illinois State Archives
 East Waterford School

Townships in Fulton County, Illinois
Townships in Illinois